Roger Nivelt (30 August 1899 – 1 June 1962) was a French painter. His work was part of the painting event in the art competition at the 1932 Summer Olympics.

References

1899 births
1962 deaths
20th-century French painters
20th-century French male artists
French male painters
Olympic competitors in art competitions
Painters from Paris